KA Commuter line Jatinegara–Bogor or the Jakarta loop line was a commuter rail line in Indonesia, operated by PT Kereta Commuter Indonesia (KCI). The line connected  station in East Jakarta and Bogor station in Bogor, West Java. On maps and diagrams, the line was shown using the colour "yellow". The Jatinegara–Bogor line was the second busiest line in the KA Commuter system. Covering the distance of 69.35 kilometres, it was the longest KA Commuter line, combining the loop-line on Jatinegara–Kampung Bandan–Tanah Abang–Manggarai with Manggarai–Depok–Bogor lines.

The yellow line, especially the loopline corridor between Jatinegara and Manggarai stations was the main trunk line or feeder for KA Commuter line system. It connects to pink line at Kampung Bandan, brown line at Duri, green line at Tanah Abang, and blue line at Jatinegara and Manggarai. The line and stations between Manggarai and Bogor were shared with the red line. There was a branch line connecting Duri in West Jakarta to Nambo station in Bogor Regency, the intersection is located after Citayam.

KAI Commuter announced in 21 May 2022 that the line would be deactivated by 28 May 2022, as part of Manggarai station upgrade. Its inner city loop section would be absorbed by a new alignment of Cikarang Line, to be known as Cikarang Loop Line, which operate in a full loop in addition to existing Jatinegara-Cikarang section. Its branch to Nambo would be redirected to Jakarta Kota instead of Angke as part of Bogor Line (currently known as Central Line) .

Stations 
The distance table of Commuterline stations. This data was correct on 27 May 2022.

Nambo branch line

Proposed extension 
Ministry of Transportation have attempted to examine the possibility of extending the line beyond Bogor towards Sukabumi. In February 2021, a tender for feasibility study for Bogor-Lido track electrification was announced by Kemenhub's e-procurement website. In May 2021, a regional office of the ministry posted an update to existing Bogor-Sukabumi double-tracking project, mentioning the possibility of KRL Commuterline extension to Sukabumi.

Rolling stocks 
- Former JR East 203 series (8, 10 car per set) 
- Former JR East 205 series (8, 10 car per set) 
- Tokyo Metro 05 series
- Tokyo Metro 6000 series (8, 10 car per set)
- Tokyo Metro 7000 series

Incidents and accidents

 On Sunday, March 10, 2019, a former Tokyu 8500 series trainset (no. 8612F) travelling as KA 1722 on Jatinegara–Bogor line derailed between Cilebut and Bogor station.  KA 1722 crashed, rolled over, and hit the LAA (overhead catenary) pole until it collapsed and the train body dented on the front side.  Meanwhile, car no. 8712 and 8912 rolled over.  There are no reports of casualties, the four undamaged cars were joined to trainset 8610F to form a 12-car trainset and the rest were written off.

References

External links
 KRL Jabotabek website 
 Jabotabek Railnews 
 KRL Jabodetabek 
 KRL-Mania – KRL Jabotabek community site 

Closed railway lines
Jatinegara
Transport in Jakarta
Transport in West Java